Black Man (published as Thirteen in North America and later UK editions) is a 2007 science fiction novel by the British author Richard Morgan. It won the 2008 Arthur C. Clarke Award.

Premise
Carl Marsalis is a selectively bred human ("genetic variant") known as a "Thirteen", characterized by high aggression and low sociability. Bred to serve in a military capacity, Thirteens were later confined on reservations or exiled to Mars. Carl, having won by lottery the right to return from Mars, works covertly, tracking down renegade Thirteens.

Related works
Morgan's 2018 novel Thin Air is set in the same reality, with another genetically-modified protagonist but with all the action taking place on Mars.

References

2007 British novels
British science fiction novels
Novels set on Mars
Novels by Richard Morgan
Victor Gollancz Ltd books